The Portuguese legislative election, 1860 was held on 1 January.

Parties
Históricos
Miguelistas
Regeneradores

Results

Notes and references

Legislative elections in Portugal
1860 elections in Europe
1860 in Portugal
January 1860 events